Mbogwe District is one of the five districts of Geita Region of Tanzania. It is bordered to the north by Chato District and Geita District, to the east by Kahama Rural District and Kahama Urban District, to the south by Kahama Rural District, and to the west by Bukombe District.

As of 2012, the population of Mbogwe was 193,922. Mbogwe was established in 2012, when it was split off from Bukombe District and became part of the newly established Geita Region.

Transport
Mbogwe District is connected by paved trunk road T3 (from Morogoro to the Rwanda border), that passes through the district from east to west.

Wards
As of 2012, Mbogwe District was administratively divided into 16 wards.

The 12 wards in 2012:

 Bukandwe
 Ikobe
 Ikunguigazi
 Ilolangulu
 Iponya
 Isebya
 Lugunga
 Lulembela
 Masumbwe
 Mbogwe
 Mgemo
 Nanda
 Ng'homolwa
 Nyakafulu
 Nyasato
 Ushirika

References

Districts of Geita Region